The Mitsubishi Ki-83 (キ83) was a Japanese experimental long range heavy fighter designed near the end of World War II. It did not reach production status.

Design and development
The Mitsubishi Ki-83 was designed as a long range heavy fighter. It was designed and built by a team led by Tomio Kubo, designer of the highly successful Mitsubishi Ki-46. The design was a response to a 1943 specification for a new heavy fighter with great range. The first of four prototypes flew on 18 November 1944. The machines displayed remarkable maneuverability for aircraft of their size, being able to execute a 671 m (2,200 ft) diameter loop in just 31 seconds at a speed of over 644 km/h (400 mph). The Ki-83 carried a powerful armament of two 30 mm (1.18 in) and two 20 mm cannon in its nose.

Despite the bomb-ravaged Japanese manufacturing sector, plans for the Ki-83 to enter production were underway when Japan surrendered on 15 August 1945.

Both the existence and performance of the Ki-83 were little known during the war, even in Japan. It was completely unknown in Allied military aviation circles – as demonstrated by the fact that the Ki-83 had not been given a reporting name. Most early photographs of the type were taken during the post-war occupation of Japan, when the four prototypes were seized by the United States Army Air Forces and repainted with USAAF insignia. When they were evaluated by U.S. aeronautical engineers and other experts, a Ki-83 using high-octane fuel reached a speed of 762 km/h (473 mph), at an altitude of 7,000 metres (23,000 ft).

Variants
 Ki-83 experimental long-range heavy fighter, four prototypes built.
 Ki-95 projected reconnaissance version, none built.
 Ki-103 projected development, none built.

Specifications (Ki-83)

See also

References

Notes

Bibliography

  (new edition 1987 by Putnam Aeronautical Books, .)
 
 
 Unknown Author(s). Famous Aircraft of the World, first series, no.76: Japanese Army Experimental Fighters (1). Tokyo, Japan: Bunrin-Do Co. Ltd., August 1976.

External links

 Dave's Warbirds
 Warbirds Resource Group

Ki-083, Mitsubish
Ki-083, Mitsubishi
Ki-083
Mid-wing aircraft
Aircraft first flown in 1944
Twin piston-engined tractor aircraft